John F. Volek (born c. 1946) is an American former college football coach and college athletics administrator. He served as the head football coach at California State University, Sacramento from 1995 to 2002, compiling a record of 31–57–1. Volek was the head football coach at Walla Walla Community College in Walla Walla, Washington from 1984 to 1987, leading his teams to a record of 31–7 and three Northwest Athletic Association of Community Colleges (NWAACC) championships. He was then the head football coach at Fresno City College in Fresno, California from 1988 to 1994, tallying a mark of 51–24–1 in seven seasons and winning three Central Valley Conference titles, in 1988, 1993, and 1994.

Volek graduated from Placer High School in Auburn, California and then played junior college football at Sierra College in Rocklin, California from 1965 to 1966. He transferred to Weber State University, playing center for the Webers State Wildcfats in 1967, and then to University of California, Riverside, where he played again at center on the 1968 UC Riverside Highlanders football team. He received a master's degree from the UC Riverside in 1972. Volek was hired as head football coach at Santa Cruz High School in 1972. After two years at Santa Cruz High School, he moved on to Mt. San Jacinto College in San Jacinto, California to become an assistant football coach and teach in the school's new department of recreation leadership.

Volek is the father of Billy Volek, who played quarterback in the National Football League (NFL) from 2000 to 2011.

Head coaching record

College

References

External links
 Sacramento State profile

Year of birth missing (living people)
1940s births
Living people
American football centers
Sacramento State Hornets athletic directors
Sacramento State Hornets football coaches
Sierra Wolverines football players
UC Riverside Highlanders football coaches
UC Riverside Highlanders football players
Walla Walla Warriors football coaches
Weber State Wildcats football players
High school football coaches in California
Placer High School alumni
University of California, Riverside
Coaches of American football from California
Players of American football from California